Benjamin Wingerter (born 25 March 1983) is a German former professional footballer who played as a defensive midfielder. With Rot-Weiss Essen Wingerter won the Lower Rhine Cup in 2015.

References

External links
 

1988 births
Living people
German footballers
Association football midfielders
Germany youth international footballers
3. Liga players
Regionalliga players
FC Schalke 04 II players
1. FC Union Berlin players
VfR Aalen players
Sportfreunde Lotte players
Rot-Weiss Essen players
FC Kray players
Sportspeople from Gelsenkirchen
Footballers from North Rhine-Westphalia